Permanently is the third studio album by American country music singer Mark Wills. Released in 2000 on Mercury Nashville Records, the album produced three singles on the Billboard Hot Country Singles & Tracks chart: "Back at One", "Almost Doesn't Count", and (Everything There Is to Know About You", which peaked at Nos. 2, 19, and 33, respectively. "Back at One" was originally recorded by Brian McKnight, and "Almost Doesn't Count" by Brandy.

The album itself peaked at No. 3 on the Billboard Top Country Albums chart and No. 23 on The Billboard 200, making for Wills's highest peaks on these two charts. In addition, Permanently received RIAA gold certification for U.S. shipments of 500,000 copies.

Track listing

Personnel
Eddie Bayers – drums
Paul Franklin – steel guitar
Aubrey Haynie – fiddle, mandolin
Liana Manis – background vocals
Brent Mason – electric guitar
Gary Prim – keyboards
John Wesley Ryles – background vocals 
Mark Wills – lead vocals 
John D. Willis – acoustic guitar 
Glenn Worf – bass guitar

Charts

References

2000 albums
Mark Wills albums
Albums produced by Carson Chamberlain
Mercury Nashville albums